Jabbour Douaihy (1949 – 23 June 2021)  was a critically-acclaimed Lebanese writer, translator, and professor of literature. His novels were nominated four times for the International Prize for Arabic Fiction, and he has also published translations, short story collections, and children's books. His work, mostly originally in Arabic, has been translated several languages, including English and French.

Life and education 
Douaihy was born in Zgharta, Lebanon in 1949 and was a member of the city's prominent El Douaihy family. 

He obtained a PhD in comparative literature from the New Sorbonne University and served a professor of French literature at the Lebanese University of Tripoli.  

He was also known for mentoring younger writers, such as through the International Prize for Arabic Fiction Nadwa.

Critical reception 
Academic and translator Paula Haydar describes Jabbour as "a master of detail" in his writing.  

Douaihy was nominated four times for the International Prize for Arabic Fiction, the most prestigious literary award in the Arab region. He was shortlisted three times and longlisted once. He is one of only five authors to have received such repeated recognition by this award. His 2008 novel June Rain was nominated for the Arabic Booker Prize and has been translated into several languages. His last novel, The King of India, was shortlisted for the Arabic Booker Prize in 2020. The Vagrant and The American Neighborhood were also nominated for the Arabic Booker. The Vagrant was also awarded Institut du Monde Arabe's 2013 annual award for the best Arabic novel translated into French.  

His work has also received awards and award nominations in translation. Autumn Equinox (2001) was the first of Douaihy's novels to be translated into English, by Nay Youssef Hannawi, and it won the Arkansas Arabic Translation Award. Paula Haydar's translation of June Rain was runner-up for the Banipal Prize for Arabic Literary Translation in 2014. He has also been translated into French by Stephanie Dujols.

A book-length critical analysis of his work was published in 2021 under the title Jabbour Douaihy: Novelist of Lebanese Life."

Select works

Novels 

 Poison in the Air (2021)
 The King of India (Lebanon: Dar Al Saqi, 2019)
 Printed in Beirut (2016)
 Rayya of the River (2015)
 The American Neighborhood (Lebanon, 2014)
 The Vagrant or Chased Away (Lebanon, 2012)
 June Rain (Beirut, Lebanon: Dar An Nahar, 2006)
 Night of the Calligraphers (2006)
 Rose Fountain (2002) 
 Autumn Equinox (1995)
 The Soul of the Forest

Novels available in English Translation

 Autumn Equinox, translated by Nay Youssef Hannawi and published by University of Arkansas Press
 June Rain, translated by Paula Haydar
 The American Quarter, translated by Paula Haydar, published by Interlink Books

Short story collections 

 Dying Between Relatives is Sleeping (2010)

Translations into Arabic by Jabbour Douaihy 

 Amin Maalouf's In the Name of Identity (2004) 
 Dominique Vidal's Israel's Origin Sin: The expulsion of the Palestinians re-examined by the New Historians (2002) 
 Hubert Vedrine's France in an Age of Globalization (2001) and History Strikes Back (2007) 
 Carole Dagher's Men Who Make Peace (1994)

Book chapters 

 "St. Jerome as the representation of melancholy." In Reflections on Islamic Art, ed. by Ahdaf Soueif. Doha, Qatar: Muslim of Islamic Art, 2011.

Death
On 23 July 2021 Douaihy died after a long illness.

References

External links
 Author blog
 Jabbour Douaihy on Ehden Family Tree Website

1949 births
2021 deaths
Lebanese Maronites
Lebanese novelists
University of Paris alumni
People from Zgharta
Lebanese expatriates in France